Poland is a town in Androscoggin County, Maine, United States. The population was 5,906 at the 2020 census. Set among rolling hills and numerous lakes, the town is home to Range Ponds State Park, which includes hiking trails and a pristine freshwater beach. Poland is also a historic resort area. It is included in the Lewiston-Auburn, Maine metropolitan statistical area, which itself is part of the Greater Portland-Lewiston Combined Statistical Area.

History

Land was granted by the Massachusetts General Court in 1765 to officers and soldiers who served with Sir William Phips in the 1690 Battle of Quebec. It replaced a 1736 grant made to them called Bakerstown (now Salisbury, New Hampshire) which was ruled invalid in 1741 at the separation of New Hampshire from Massachusetts. The new plantation was also called Bakerstown (after Captain Thomas Baker), and included present-day Poland, Minot, Mechanic Falls and the greater part of Auburn.

Settled in 1767 by Nathaniel Bailey and Daniel Lane, Bakerstown Plantation would be incorporated as Poland on February 17, 1795. Poland is named after an "ancient melody" of the same name.

Called the North Family of Shakers, the village was founded by members who moved from Gorham in 1819. The village lasted until 1887.

Industry was attracted to Poland's water power sites. In 1859, when the population was 2,660, it had four sawmills, a gristmill, a tannery and a carriage factory. The St. Lawrence and Atlantic Railroad passed through the northeastern corner of the town, spurring development and bringing tourists drawn to its scenic ponds and gentle hills. By 1893, when Mechanic Falls was set off as a separate town, Poland had evolved into a Gilded Age resort town.

In 1797, The Wentworth Ricker Inn in South Poland opened at the homestead Jabez Ricker, acquired from a 1794 land swap with the Alfred Shaker Village in Alfred. But when the railroad replaced stage travel, patronage declined and the inn closed. Then a grandson, Hiram Ricker, began proclaiming that the mineral spring on his family's property had cured his dyspepsia. People began arriving to sample the spring's curative waters, which flow 8 gallons a minute. Reopened in 1861, the inn was enlarged and renamed The Mansion House. But even that property could not handle the crowds of tourists, so in 1875 the family expanded the property, build an extravagant house that was dubbed "Ricker's folly" due to skepticism that such a large property would be successful.

On July 4, 1876, the Poland Spring House opened atop Ricker's Hill, an elevation of 800 feet (244 m) above sea level with magnificent views to the White Mountains. The hotel would be augmented over the years by architects John Calvin Stevens, Albert Winslow Cobb and Harry Wilkerson. It became a self-contained and exclusive spa, with guards at gatehouses instructed to turn away sightseers. With luxurious accommodations for 450 guests, the hotel attracted the rich and famous. Patrons included Gen. Benjamin Butler, Sen. James G. Blaine, Joan Crawford, Jimmy Durante, Jack Paar and Robert Goulet. But following World War II, the era of grand hotels waned. When the Rickers sold the Poland Spring House, its new owners allowed the sprawling facilities to deteriorate. Apollo Industries purchased the hotel in 1963 and converted it to the largest Women's Job Corps facility in the United States. The Job Corps dormitory was vacated in 1969, and was destroyed by a spectacular fire on July 3, 1975.

Today, the water is bottled and sold as Poland Spring water by BlueTriton Brands.

1978 P-3 Orion crash

Poland was the site of one of the last major accidents involving aircraft from Maine's Cold War air bases. A United States Navy patrol bomber from Naval Air Station Brunswick Patrol Squadron 8 (VP-8) disintegrated over Poland on September 22, 1978. An over-pressurized fuel tank caused the port wing of the Lockheed P-3 Orion to separate at the outboard engine. The detached wing sheared off part of the tail; and aerodynamic forces caused the remaining engines and starboard wing to detach from the fuselage. Debris rained down over a wide area near the Tripp Corner intersection on Route 11 shortly after noon. No homes were hit, but an explosive fuel-air fire following impact broke some windows. There were no survivors from the plane's eight-man crew.

Geography
Poland is drained by the Little Androscoggin River.

The town is crossed by state routes 11, 26 and 122. It is bordered by the towns of Mechanic Falls to the north, Minot to the northeast, Auburn to the east, New Gloucester to the southeast, Casco and Raymond to the southwest, and Otisfield and Oxford to the northwest.

Tripp Pond

Tripp Pond is on the west side of Maine State Route 11, which provides shoulder parking for public access to the east shore of the pond. There is a ramp for trailered boats at the south end of the pond. Summer water temperatures are too high for trout, but the pond provides good habitat for white perch and largemouth bass. The north end of the pond overflows through a series of shallow ponds to the Little Androscoggin River near Welchville in the town of Oxford, Maine  to the north.

Climate
This climatic region is typified by large seasonal temperature differences, with warm to hot (and often humid) summers and cold (sometimes severely cold) winters.  According to the Köppen climate classification system, Poland has a humid continental climate, Dfb on climate maps.

Demographics

2010 census
As of the census of 2010, there were 5,376 people, 2,140 households, and 1,581 families living in the town. The racial makeup of the town was 97.4% White, 0.4% African American, 0.3% Native American, 0.4% Asian, 0.2% from other races, and 1.3% from two or more races. Hispanic or Latino of any race were 0.6% of the population.

There were 2,140 households, of which 31.5% had children under the age of 18 living with them, 59.6% were married couples living together, 8.9% had a female householder with no husband present, 5.4% had a male householder with no wife present, and 26.1% were non-families. 18.5% of all households were made up of individuals, and 6.4% had someone living alone who was 65 years of age or older. The average household size was 2.49 and the average family size was 2.81.

The median age in the town was 43.4 years. 22.2% of residents were under the age of 18; 5.8% were between the ages of 18 and 24; 24.7% were from 25 to 44; 35% were from 45 to 64; and 12.2% were 65 years of age or older. The gender makeup of the town was 50.0% male and 50.0% female.

2000 census
Per the census of 2000, there were 4,866 people, 1,845 households, and 1,437 families living in the town.

The median income for a household in the town was $47,824, and the median income for a family was $55,427. Males had a median income of $33,284 versus $23,926 for females. The per capita income for the town was $22,346.  About 1.8% of families and 3.4% of the population were below the poverty line, including 2.0% of those under age 18 and 4.7% of those age 65 or over.

Voter registration

Education

The Town of Poland is a member of Regional School Unit 16 (RSU 16). Poland Regional High School (PRHS) serves as the district high school of RSU 16 and is open to all high school-age students of Poland, Mechanic Falls, and Minot, Maine. Students from Raymond, Maine, as well, attend PRHS on a tuition basis. The school's athletic teams compete in Maine class "B" athletics. The school's mascot is the knight and the school colors are blue and silver. Connected to the high school is Bruce M. Whittier Middle School.  This school serves all three towns' 7th and 8th grade students (as of 2010).  Both schools opened in 1999. Poland Community School, last expanded in 2002, serves Poland's K–6 students.

Elan School, a private 8–12 behavior modification boarding school that faced numerous reports of abuse throughout its existence, opened in Poland in 1970 and remained until 2011.

Popular culture

Two episodes of the popular 1960s television series Route 66 were filmed in Poland: "Come Out, Come Out, Wherever You Are" (1963) starring Lon Chaney, Jr.; and "Same Picture, Different Frame" (1963) starring Joan Crawford, Tom Bosley, and Patrick O'Neal.

Sites of interest
 Old Poland Corner Schoolhouse
 Poland Spring Preservation Society
 Range Ponds State Park

Notable people

 John Nevins Andrews, minister, missionary, writer, editor and scholar
 Augustus Burbank, physician, born in Poland
 Eleazer Burbank, physician, father of Augustus, practiced in Poland
 Irving Gilman Davis, economist and educator
 Moncena Dunn, bookkeeper and army officer
 Bert M. Fernald, US senator and 47th governor of Maine
 Jabez K. Walker, Wisconsin assemblyman
 Amos Whitney, founder of Pratt and Whitney

References

Further reading
 Bryant F. Tolles, Jr., The Grand Resort Hotels of the White Mountains, 1998, David R. Godine, publishers, Boston, Massachusetts

External links

 Town of Poland, Maine
 Ricker Memorial Library
 Poland Sno Travelers Snowmobile Club
 Poland Regional High School
 Maine.gov – Poland, Maine
Maine Genealogy: Poland, Androscoggin County, Maine

 
Towns in Androscoggin County, Maine
Towns in Maine